The Zarkos is a small mountain range in central Thessaly in Greece. It is situated on the border of the Larissa and the Trikala regional unit. Its highest point is 734 m. It is 15 km long and 12 km wide and covers and area of 100 to 150 km². Grasslands are in the lower elevations and forests in the higher elevations. It is drained by the river Titarisios to the north and the Pineios to the south.

Nearest places

 North: Damasi and Vlachogiannio
 South: Pineias, Zarko and Farkadona
 West: Grizano

Mountain ranges of Greece
Landforms of Larissa (regional unit)
Landforms of Trikala (regional unit)
Landforms of Thessaly